Trechus armenus is a species of ground beetle in the subfamily Trechinae. It was described by Iablokoff-Khnzorian in 1963.

References

armenus
Beetles described in 1963